The Frank was the currency of the Swiss canton of Berne between 1798 and 1850. It was subdivided into 10 Batzen, each of 10 Rappen. It was worth th the French silver écu or 6.67 g fine silver.

History

The Frank was the currency of the Helvetian Republic from 1798, replacing the Thaler in Berne. The Helvetian Republic ceased issuing coins in 1803. Berne issued coins between 1808 and 1836. In 1850, the Swiss franc was introduced, with 1 Berne Frank = 1.4597 Swiss francs.

Coins
Berne also counterstamped various French écu and 6 livres for use as 40 Batzen coins.

References

External links
 

Modern obsolete currencies
Currencies of Switzerland
1800s establishments in Switzerland
1850 disestablishments in Switzerland
Canton of Bern